The 2020 United States presidential election in Virginia was held on Tuesday, November 3, 2020, as part of the 2020 United States presidential election in which all 50 states plus the District of Columbia participated. Virginia voters chose electors to represent them in the Electoral College via a popular vote, pitting the Republican Party's nominee, incumbent President Donald Trump, and running mate Vice President Mike Pence against Democratic Party nominee, former Vice President Joe Biden, and his running mate California Senator Kamala Harris. Virginia has 13 electoral votes in the Electoral College.

Prior to the election, most news organizations considered this a state Biden would win, or a likely blue state. On the day of the election, Biden won Virginia with 54.11% of the vote, and by a margin of 10.11%, the best performance for a Democratic presidential candidate since Franklin D. Roosevelt in 1944. Trump became the first Republican incumbent to consecutively lose Virginia since William Howard Taft and Biden became the first Democratic nominee to win Chesterfield County and Lynchburg City since 1948, Virginia Beach City since 1964, James City County since 1968, and Stafford County since 1976. He also flipped Chesapeake City back to the Democratic Party. Trump flipped no counties or independent cities in the state. Nevertheless, Biden became the first Democrat since 1992 to win without Buckingham County, and the first since 1960 to win without Westmoreland County, a notable bellwhether. 

The diversification of Northern Virginia as well as sliding suburban support for Republicans allowed Biden to win the once-key battleground state without actively campaigning in it. Biden won Henrico County, Loudoun County, Prince William County, and Fairfax County with 63.7%, 61.5%, 62.6%, and 69.9%, respectively; all four were former suburban bastions of the Republican Party in Virginia, the first outside Richmond and the others in Northern Virginia. All four had voted Republican in every election from 1968 through 2000. In Arlington County, a closer DC-area suburban county that had turned Democratic several decades earlier, Biden won with 80.6% of the vote, becoming the first nominee of either party in more than a century to crack 80% there. Biden's combined margin in Fairfax, Prince William, Loudoun, and Arlington Counties was greater than his statewide margin of victory. Crucially for his performance in Northern Virginia, Biden carried government workers by 18%. 

In this election, Virginia voted 5.6% more Democratic than the nation as a whole. Although Virginia was considered a reliably Republican state at the presidential level from 1952 to 2004 (having only gone to the Democrats once during that period, in Lyndon B. Johnson's 1964 landslide), it has not voted Republican in a presidential election since 2004. Migration into counties in Northern Virginia close to Washington, D.C. has tilted these densely populated areas towards the Democrats. This was the first election since 1988 that a presidential candidate won Virginia by double digits (George H. W. Bush having carried the state by 20.5% in his first run), and the first election in which any presidential candidate received over 2 million votes in Virginia. 

As fellow Southern state Georgia tilted towards Biden, he became the first Democrat since Harry Truman in 1948 to carry both states. Conversely, Virginia and Florida continued drifting apart after a more-than-100-year run (from 1880 through 2012) of voting alike in almost every election (only voting differently in 1976 and 1996, when the Democratic nominees won Florida but lost Virginia.) In 2016, Hillary Clinton became the first Democrat since Reconstruction to win Virginia while losing Florida, a pattern that would be repeated with Biden in 2020. This was also the first election in which a former Confederate state backed a Democratic candidate by a margin of victory greater than 10% since 1996, when Arkansas and Louisiana did so for Bill Clinton.

Primary elections

Canceled Republican primary

The Virginia Republican Party is one of several state GOP parties that have officially canceled their respective primaries and caucuses. Donald Trump's re-election  campaign and GOP officials have cited the fact that Republicans canceled several state primaries when George H. W. Bush and George W. Bush sought a second term in 1992 and 2004, respectively; and Democrats scrapped some of their primaries when Bill Clinton and Barack Obama were seeking reelection in 1996 and 2012, respectively. At the Virginia State Republican Convention, originally scheduled for May 2020 but postponed to August 15, 2020, the state party will formally bind all 48 of its national pledged delegates to Trump.

Democratic primary

The Virginia Democratic primary took place on March 3, 2020, as part of the "Super Tuesday" suite of elections.

Joe Biden, Elizabeth Warren, and Bernie Sanders were among the major declared candidates.

Green primary
The Green Party of Virginia conducted an online ranked choice primary from April 20 to April 26, 2020.

General election

Predictions

Polling
Graphical summary

Aggregate polls

Polls

with Donald Trump and Michael Bloomberg

with Donald Trump and Pete Buttigieg

with Donald Trump and Kamala Harris

with Donald Trump and Amy Klobuchar

with Donald Trump and Bernie Sanders

with Donald Trump and Elizabeth Warren

with Donald Trump and Generic Democrat

with Donald Trump and Generic Opponent

with Generic Republican and Generic Democrat

Results

Results by city and county
Independent cities have been italicized.

Results by congressional district
Biden won 7 out of Virginia’s 11 congressional districts.

Counties and independent cities that flipped from Republican to Democratic
 Chesapeake (independent city)
 Chesterfield (no municipalities)
 Lynchburg (independent city)
 James City (no municipalities)
 Stafford (no municipalities)
 Virginia Beach (independent city)

Voter demographics

See also
 United States presidential elections in Virginia
 2020 United States presidential election
 2020 Democratic Party presidential primaries
 2020 Republican Party presidential primaries
 2020 United States elections

Notes

Partisan clients

References

External links
 
 
  (State affiliate of the U.S. League of Women Voters)
 

Virginia
2020
Presidential